John Raymond Reeder (July 29, 1914 –  February 8, 2009) was an American agrostologist who was active in identifying the grasses of New Guinea, Wyoming, and Arizona.

Biography
Reeder was born on a farm in Charlotte, Michigan on July 29, 1914. He went on to attend Oregon State University and met Charlotte Olive Goodding, whom he married in 1941. Reeder joined the military upon the involvement of America in World War II. He was stationed in a malaria unit in New Guinea. While on duty, he collected grasses for curation back in America.

Upon his return from the war, Reeder was accepted into a Ph.D. program at Harvard University. He took classes while also working at the Arnold Arboretum, and eventually earned his doctorate. In 1947, he accepted a position at Yale University in the forestry department. He taught courses on dendrology, agrostology, and plant taxonomy. He also served as Curator of the Herbarium at the Peabody Museum of Natural History.

In 1968, Reeder and his wife left Connecticut after his retirement from Yale. They continued their research at the Rocky Mountain Herbarium of the University of Wyoming. The couple relocated to Tucson, Arizona to research at the University of Arizona Herbarium in 1983.

After a severe car accident, the two decided to retire.

Legacy
The genus Reederochloa and species Muhlenbergia reederorum were named in honor of the Reeders by Thomas Robert Soderstrom.

References

External links

1914 births
2009 deaths
American botanists
Agrostologists
Yale University faculty
University of Wyoming faculty
University of Arizona faculty
Oregon State University alumni
Harvard University alumni